Mass media in Benin was formerly controlled by the government but there has been a loosening of control since the introduction of democracy to the country in the 1990s.

See also
Agence Bénin Presse
Communications in Benin
Censorship in Benin
List of newspapers in Benin
 List of radio stations in Africa: Benin

References

Bibliography
 

 
Benin
Benin